Selmon may refer to:

Dewey Selmon (born 1953), former football linebacker
Kenny Selmon (born 1996), American track and field athlete
Lee Roy Selmon (1954–2011), American professional football player and college athletics administrator
Lucious Selmon (born 1951), collegiate and professional American football nose guard, football coach
Zac Selmon (born 1984), son of Dewey; collegiate American football tight end, college athletics administrator

See also
I-4/Selmon Expressway Connector, a toll road in the city of Tampa, Florida, US
Lee Roy Selmon Expressway, an all-electronic, limited access toll road in Hillsborough County, Florida, US
Salman (disambiguation)
Salmon
Selman (disambiguation)
Solomon
Sulman